Mercantile Bank Limited is a commercial bank headquartered in Dhaka, Bangladesh.

History 
It is a public limited company with limited liability under the bank companies act, 1991. Its share are listed in Dhaka Stock Exchange and Chittagong Stock Exchange. The bank provide products and services in retail banking, corporate finance, Islamic finance, asset management, equity brokerage and security. It has 119 branches in Bangladesh and employs around 2,300 employees.

See also

 Mercantile Bank (disambiguation)
 List of banks in Bangladesh

References

External links
Website
Mercantile bank limited Review 

Banks of Bangladesh
Companies listed on the Dhaka Stock Exchange
Companies listed on the Chittagong Stock Exchange
Banks established in 1999
Banks of Bangladesh with Islamic banking services
1999 establishments in Bangladesh